The first flag of the Ukrainian Soviet Socialist Republic (UkSSR) was adopted on 10 March 1919 to serve as the symbol of state of the Ukrainian SSR. Details of the official flag changed periodically before the collapse of the Soviet Union in 1991, but all had as their basis the communist red flag. According to the decree of the Presidium of Supreme Soviet of Ukrainian SSR on 21 November 1949, the blue in the bottom "symbolises the mightiness and beauty of the people, and the blue banner of Bohdan Khmelnytsky".

Color scheme

History
Before this 1919 flag, a flag in 1918 was used with red and blue, with yellow stripes in the canton.

The first flag was red with the gold Cyrillic sans-serif letters У.С.С.Р.  (USSR, acronym for Ukrayinskaya Sotsialisticheskaya Sovetskaya Respublika (Ukrainian Socialist Soviet Republic) in the Russian language). A decade later, the Ukrainian initials У.С.Р.Р. appeared (USRR, for Ukrayinsʹka Sotsialistychna Radyansʹka Respublika). In the 1930s a gold border was added. In 1937, a new flag was adopted, with a small gold hammer and sickle added above the gold Cyrillic serif letters У.Р.С.Р. (the name had changed, transposing the second and third words).

The Soviet Union and two of its republics (Ukraine and Byelorussia) all became members of the nascent United Nations (UN) in 1945. Since all of their flags were red with only small markings in the upper left corner, the UN demanded changes to the flags in 1949. To comply, the Ukrainian Soviet authorities dropped the lettering and added an azure horizontal stripe ( of the width). The Ukrainian SSR adopted this new design as its official flag on 5 July 1950. Other constituent republics of the Soviet Union soon followed suit and customised the bottom third of their flags.

While the Soviet flag was flown in the later months of 1991, even after the failed coup d'état, the blue and yellow flag, even though it was a criminal offense under the Soviet law, was raised spontaneously throughout Ukraine by local activists between 14 March 1990 beginning at town of Stryi until the country's independence on 24 August 1991. The blue and yellow flag was provisionally adopted for official ceremonies in September 1991, although the Soviet-era flag officially remained until it was replaced on 28 January 1992.

In 2015, all Soviet symbolism, including the flags of the Ukrainian SSR, was recognized as a symbol of the totalitarian past and officially banned in Ukraine. Despite the ban, the flags of the Ukrainian SSR have been used in the some areas occupied by Russia during the 2022 Russian invasion of Ukraine.

See also
 Emblem of the Ukrainian Soviet Socialist Republic
 Anthem of the Ukrainian Soviet Socialist Republic
 Flag of Ukraine
 List of flags of Ukraine
 Soviet imagery during the Russo-Ukrainian War

References

External links
Ukraine in the Soviet Union (early flags), detailed history of flag designs

1919 establishments in Ukraine
Ukrainian Soviet Socialist Republic
National symbols of Ukraine
Ukrainian Soviet Socialist Republic